Andrew Hayward  (born 22 June 1985) is a New Zealand field hockey player.  At the 2012 Summer Olympics, he competed for the national team in the men's tournament. He was a member of the men's team which won the bronze medal at the 2010 Commonwealth Games.

Hayward has played club hockey for Hampstead & Westminster in the UK, Delhi Waveriders in India and Midlands in New Zealand.

References

External links
 

1985 births
Living people
New Zealand male field hockey players
Olympic field hockey players of New Zealand
Field hockey players at the 2012 Summer Olympics
Commonwealth Games medallists in field hockey
Commonwealth Games bronze medallists for New Zealand
Field hockey players at the 2010 Commonwealth Games
Field hockey players at the 2014 Commonwealth Games
Hockey India League players
Delhi Waveriders players
Hampstead & Westminster Hockey Club players
2010 Men's Hockey World Cup players
2014 Men's Hockey World Cup players
20th-century New Zealand people
21st-century New Zealand people
Medallists at the 2010 Commonwealth Games